Matteo Solini (born 9 March 1993) is an Italian footballer who plays as a defender for Como.

Career

Youth career
Born in Bussolengo, the Province of Verona, Veneto region, Solini started his career at Verona club Chievo. In August 2009 Lombard club and defending Serie A champion of that year, Internazionale, signed Solini in co-ownership deal for €300,000. Solini suppressed the seasonal transfer record of U17 team, which Inter paid €220,000 for Manuel Canini on 23 July. However, Solini only played 1 season for Inter U17 team and Canini only half. Solini was a member for Italy U17 team in 2010 UEFA European Under-17 Football Championship qualification, which eliminated in October 2009. Since August 2010 Solini returned to Chievo for its reserve. In June 2012, Inter finally gave up the 50% registration rights back of Solini and Canini to Chievo and Cesena respectively as well as Chievo gave up the remain 50% registration rights of Enrico Alfonso to Inter. However, for accounting purpose, half of the card of Alfonso and Solini were both priced for €1.1 million.

Serie C loans
Solini signed his first professional contract for Chievo in summer 2012. The first club since graduated from the reserve team was Castiglione. He was regularly in the starting line-up for the Lombard team in Italian fourth division. On 10 July 2013 Solini and Chievo team-mate Valerio Anastasi were signed by Reggiana in temporary deal and co-ownership deal respectively . Chievo also signed Federico Scappi as part of the swap deal. In 2014–1015, moved on loan to  Real Vicenza that plays in Lega Pro.

On 7 July 2015 he moved to Renate along with Simone Moschin.

One year later he moved to Arezzo with Kevin Yamga

Como
On 15 July 2019, he signed a 2-year contract with Serie C club Como.

Notes

References

External links
 AIC profile (data by football.it) 

Italian footballers
A.C. ChievoVerona players
Inter Milan players
A.C. Reggiana 1919 players
A.C. Renate players
S.S. Arezzo players
A.C. Carpi players
Modena F.C. players
A.C.N. Siena 1904 players
Reggina 1914 players
Como 1907 players
Serie B players
Serie C players
Italy youth international footballers
Association football defenders
Sportspeople from the Province of Verona
1993 births
Living people
Footballers from Veneto